John Edwin Arnatt (9 May 1917 – 21 December 1999) was a British actor.

Early life and education 
John Arnatt was born in Petrograd, Russia on 9 May 1917. His parents were Francis and Ethel Marion (née Jephcott) Arnatt. He attended Epworth College. Arnatt trained for the stage at the Royal Academy of Dramatic Art.

Career 

One of Arnatt's most high-profile roles was as "The Deputy Sheriff of Nottingham" in the fourth and final season of 1955-60 TV series The Adventures of Robin Hood starring Richard Greene. His character filled in for Alan Wheatley, who played the regular sheriff. Arnatt's character was introduced and interacted with Wheatley's character in the episode "The Devil You Don't Know". In the 1962 film Dr Crippen, starring Donald Pleasence (who also had a recurring role in "The Adventures of Robin Hood" as Prince John), Arnatt played Chief Inspector Walter Dew. Arnatt also played an imitation "M" to Tom Adams' imitation James Bond in two films, Licensed to Kill and Where the Bullets Fly (1966). In 1967, Arnatt got something of a promotion when he played the High Sheriff of Nottingham opposite Barrie Ingham's Robin in the film A Challenge for Robin Hood.

Never well known, he amassed numerous television credits in programmes such as Steptoe and Son, Keeping Up Appearances, Dangerfield, Lovejoy, The Professionals, House of Cards, Thriller and Z-Cars. He had a recurring role in the first two series of the ITV legal drama, The Main Chance (1969–70) and in Doctor Who he was the second actor to play Time Lord Cardinal Borusa in the serial The Invasion of Time (1978). 
Later, in the television film, Marple: The Moving Finger (1985), he played Reverend Guy Calthrop.

In 1995 he was elected Master of the Green Room Lodge no. 2957.

Death
John Arnatt died at the age of 82 on 21 December 1999.

Filmography

Film

Television

References

External links 
 

1917 births
1999 deaths
British male television actors
20th-century British male actors
Alumni of RADA
British expatriates in the Russian Empire